CPBL Home Run Derby is generally held before the day of the CPBL All-Star Game.

List of the winners
1992: Lu Ming-tsi (Wei Chuan Dragons) 
1993: Huang Chung-yi (Jungo Bears) 
1994: Liao Ming-hsiung (China Times Eagles) 
1995: Luis de los Santos (Brother Elephants) 
1996: Luis Iglesias (Mercuries Tigers) 
1997: Lin Chung-chiu (Mercuries Tigers) 
1998: Chang Tai-shan (Wei Chuan Dragons) 
1999: Alex Cabrera (Koos Group Whales) 
2000: Lin Chung-chiu (Sinon Bulls, 2nd time) 
2001: Chang Tai-shan (Sinon Bulls, 2nd time) 
2002: Huang Chung-yi (Sinon Bulls, 2nd time) 
2003: Chen Lien-hung (Uni-President Lions) 
2004: Peng Cheng-min (Brother Elephants) 
2005: Chen Kuan-jen (Brother Elephants) 
2006: Huang Gueh-yu (Chinatrust Whales) 
2007: Hsieh Chia-hsien (Macoto Cobras) 
2008: Tilson Brito* (Uni-President 7-Eleven Lions) 
2009: Lin Chih-sheng (La New Bears) 
2010: Kuo Chun-yu (Uni-President 7-Eleven Lions) 
2011: Chung Cheng-yu (Lamigo Monkeys) 
2012: Chung Cheng-yu (Lamigo Monkeys, 2nd time) 
2013: Lin Yi-chuan   (EDA Rhinos) 
2014: Lan Yin-lun (Lamigo Monkeys) 
2015: Lin Chih-sheng (Lamigo Monkeys, 2nd time) 
2016: Lin Chih-sheng (CTBC Brothers, 3rd time) 
2017: Yang Yao-hsun (Lamigo Monkeys) 
2018: Andrew Campbell (Brisbane Bandits) 
2019: Chun-Hsiu Chen (Lamigo Monkeys) 
2020: Cancelled due to COVID-19 pandemic

* Making the record of the most home runs in annual contest and most home runs in a single round.

See also
 Chinese Professional Baseball League
 CPBL All-Star Game
 Taiwan Series

Chinese Professional Baseball League competitions